Shaman's Tears was an American comic book series created by Mike Grell and published by Image Comics.

The comic starred Joshua Brand, the son of a half-Sioux father and an Irish mother, who returns as an adult to the reservation he ran away from as a child. Discovering he mystically possesses the powers of all animals and the Earth itself, he becomes the protector of the planet. The book often dealt with ecological and animal rights issues.

Jon Sable guest starred in issues #5-9 of the series (May 1993 - Aug 1995), his first appearance since the cancellation of the First Comics series Sable in 1990.

Media adaptations
In 2022, American audio production company Pocket Universe Productions, of which the AudioComics Company (producers of the Locke & Key and The X-Files audio dramas for Audible Studios) is a division, announced plans to produce a full-cast fiction podcast adapting the original series. The series will be produced by PUP founder Lance Roger Axt and director Jack Bowman, adapted by Grell and Choctaw writer Desmond Hassing, in conjunction with Native Voices at the Autry Museum of the American West under the Artistic Direction of actress DeLanna Studi, and The Fantasy Network for crowdfunding.

References

Image Comics titles